Samrala is a city and a municipal council in Ludhiana district in the Indian state of Punjab. It is about 35 km east of the district headquarters Ludhiana, on the highway to Chandigarh. Samrala is a Class III Municipality. It is also known for the oldest tehsil situated in this city. It is also believed that the name Samrala came from the name of two brothers Sama and Rala.

Geography
It has an average elevation of 249 metres (816 feet).

Demographics
 Samrala had population of 19,678 of which 10,375 were males while 9,303 were females as per report released by Census India 2011.

The population of children aged of 0-6 was 2008 which was 10.20% of the population. The female sex ratio is of 897 against state average of 895. The child sex ratio in Samrala is 803 compared to Punjab state average of 846. The literacy rate of Samrala city is 83.70% higher than state average of 75.84%. In Samrala, male literacy is 87.28% while female literacy rate is 79.76%.

Samrala has substantial population of Schedule Caste. Schedule Caste constitutes 29.11% of total population in Samrala. Samrala currently doesn’t have any Schedule Tribes.

Politics
The city is part of the Samrala Assembly Constituency.

References

External links
  Municipal Council Samrala
  Allahabad Bank, Samrala
  List of Villages in Samrala Tehsil

Cities and towns in Ludhiana district